Nehrəm is a village and the most populous municipality in the Babek District of Nakhchivan, Azerbaijan. It is located 4 km in the south from the district center, on the left bank of the Araz River. Its population is busy with grain-growing, vine-growing, horticulture, vegetable-growing, and animal husbandry. There are 3 secondary schools, technical and vocational school, club, 4 libraries, kindergarten, music school, the house of schoolchildren, maternity hospital and hospital in the village. It has a population of 13,900 people. The water pipeline was built to the village from 4.3 km distance (1993). Nearby of the village there are workshops of aslant. Until recently, it was Azerbaijan's most populous rural community until surpassed by Ərkivan.

Nehram is a historical village. Imamzada shrine in the village has an ancient history. In the south-west of the village, in the place called Gyzylburun, have been found the ruins of the settlement and cemetery of the Bronze Age. There are residence and cemetery of medieval ages in the territory of the village. The tombstones are content from tombs with inscriptions and stone-sculpted figures of ram.

Etymology
According to the information of the 19th century, in the Nakhchivan province, the water used for irrigation, was belonged to the separate landlords, only in individual cases, it was belonged to the entire community. One of these communities was the Nehram community. According to the researchers, the name was made up with components of words of  nəhr (river, canal, running water) and am//əm (community) in the Arabic language and means "water owned by the community".

Nehram
Nehram - is the place of residence of the Middle Ages. It was recorded in 1967. Its area is 3 ha. Many remains of artefacts are scattered on the place of residence. The remains of building was completely destroyed. Cultural layer has content from clay with mixture soil. At result of researchings have been found pottery, raw and brick parts, the mainly red and gray pottery (jugs, kasa, lamps, glass etc.) decorated in different ways which typical of the Middle Ages. According to the findings, the monument dates from the 5th-18th centuries.

J. Mammadguluzade on Nehram
In 1885, the first secular school opened in Nehram. J.Mammadguluzadeh more than seven years (15 January 1890 - 10 July 1897) worked as a teacher and supervisor in the Nehram village. In order to facilitate the work of local farmers, in 1893, he achieved bring to the village the first iron plow of "Ekker" firm from Tbilisi. Writer wrote his works as "The game of raisin" (1892), "Stories of the Danabaş village" (1894), "The school of the Danabaş village" (1896) in here. For the first time in the district he involved the girls to the education and has created a museum of school-history. In 1896, J.Mammadguluzade married to the Halima Nagi gyzy from this village. From this marriage was born the first child of writer, Munevver Mammadquluzade.

Kerim Bey Ismayilov about Nehram
The education worker Kerim Bey Ismayilov in the published article, in his collection of the "sbornik materialov dlya opisaniya mestnostey the plemyon Kavkaza" (Tbilisi, 1900, the 27th edition, Section 2, page 192-201), he gave information about the territory, geographical situation, climate, fauna and flora, etymology of the name, constructions, irrigation system, employment of the population, traditions, religious rituals, holidays of the Nehram village.

References 

Populated places in Babek District